Thestor stepheni, the Stephen's skolly, is a species of butterfly in the family Lycaenidae. It is endemic to South Africa, where it is found in the Riviersonderend Mountains above the Boesmanskloof Pass and Greyton in the Western Cape. It is also found on the Klipberg.

The wingspan is 27–36 mm for males and 31–40 mm for females. Adults are on wing from December to January, with a peak in December. There is one generation per year.

References

Thestor
Butterflies described in 1968
Endemic butterflies of South Africa
Taxonomy articles created by Polbot